Euchloe charlonia, the greenish black-tip or lemon white, is a butterfly in the family Pieridae. Its range is mainly in northern Africa, the Middle East and occasionally the southern Iberian Peninsula, especially Spain.

The larvae feed on Diplotaxis pendula, Succowia balearica, Moricandia arvensis, Eruca vesicaria, Cleome arabica, Reseda villosa, Eryngium tenue and Diplotaxis acris.

Subspecies
Euchloe charlonia charlonia (North Africa, Arabia)
Euchloe charlonia mesopotamica (Staudinger, [1892])

References

Euchloe
Butterflies described in 1842
Taxa named by Hugo Fleury Donzel